Marc Louis Maxime de Jonge (16 February 1949 – 10 March 1996) was a French actor.

Career
Despite being best known for his role as the heartless Soviet Colonel Zaysen in Rambo III, de Jonge had a long and fruitful career. He was in over 50 films, mostly productions from France. He also starred in the famous Steven Spielberg film Empire of the Sun, playing a Frenchman.

Death
The actor forgot the keys to his Paris home on 10 March 1996, then he decided to climb the building to get into his home, but after arriving at the second floor, he slipped and suffered a fatal fall. He was 47 years old.

Selected filmography

L'Aigle et la Colombe (1977)
Et vive la liberté! (1978)
Guerres civiles en France (1978) - Les commissaire alliés (segment "Premier empire")
Je vous ferai aimer la vie (1979)
Au bout du bout du banc (1979)
La bande du Rex (1980) 
La Flambeuse (1981) - De Boissouvre
Les jocondes (1982) - Frédéric
Mon Curé Chez les Nudistes (1982) - Oscar, le coiffeur
Rock 'n Torah (1983) - Jess, le chauffeur de Dieu
Rue barbare (1984) - Jo, un sbire de Hagen
Ronde de nuit (1984) - Roland Bauchaud - un mécanicien d'extrême droite
Les Brésiliennes du bois de Boulogne (1984) - Carmen
Rive droite, rive gauche (1984) - Jaffré
Flagrant désir (1986) - Larbeau
La Femme secrète (1986) - Lamour
Le Complexe du kangourou (1986) - Verahege
Empire of the Sun (1986) - Frenchman
 (1987) - Le capitaine SS de l'interrogatoire
François Villon - Poetul vagabond (1987)
Rambo III (1988) - Colonel Alexei Zaysen
La Révolution française (1989) - Antoine-Joseph Santerre
Street of No Return (1989) - Eddie
Tolérance (1989) - Cabanes
Présumé dangereux (1990) - Vigier
Milena (1991) - Blei (uncredited)
L'Opération Corned-Beef (1991) - Le consul Burger
Génération oxygène (1991) - Richard Malatray
Le Secret de Sarah Tombelaine (1991) - Kerguen
Obiettivo indiscreto (1992)
Pas d'amour sans amour (1993) - Le gynécologue
La Vengeance d'une blonde (1994) - Vernon
La Cité de la peur (1994) - Le patron de Karamazov
L'affaire (1994) - Gruskhin
Killer Kid (1994) - Hans
Un indien dans la ville (1994) - Rossberg
Ainsi soient-elles (1995) - Jean
Marie de Nazareth (1995) - Hérode
Inner City (1995) - L'agresseur

References

External links
 

1949 births
1996 deaths
Actors from Nancy, France
French male film actors
French male television actors
Road incident deaths in France
20th-century French male actors